Pacritinib, sold under the brand name Vonjo, is an anti-cancer medication used to treat myelofibrosis. It is a macrocyclic protein kinase inhibitor. It mainly inhibits Janus kinase 2 (JAK2) and Fms-like tyrosine kinase 3\CD135 (FLT3).

Common side effects include diarrhea, low platelet counts, nausea, anemia, and swelling in legs.

Medical uses 
Pacritinib in indicated to treat adults who have a rare form of a bone marrow disorder known as intermediate or high-risk primary or secondary myelofibrosis and who have platelet (blood clotting cells) levels below 50,000/µL.

History 
The effectiveness and safety of pacritinib were demonstrated in a study that included 63 participants with intermediate or high-risk primary or secondary myelofibrosis and low platelets who received pacritinib 200mg twice daily or standard treatment. Effectiveness was determined based upon the proportion of participants who had a 35% or greater spleen volume reduction from baseline to week 24. Nine participants (29%) in the pacritinib treatment group had a 35% or greater spleen volume reduction, compared to one participant (3%) in the standard treatment group.

The U.S. Food and Drug Administration (FDA) granted the application for pacritinib priority review, fast track, and orphan drug designations.

Society and culture

Names 
Pacritinib is the International nonproprietary name (INN).

References

External links 
 

Aminopyrimidines
Ethers
Antineoplastic drugs
Non-receptor tyrosine kinase inhibitors
Orphan drugs
Pyrrolidines
Oxygen heterocycles
Nitrogen heterocycles